Vinjerock is a rock festival 1060 meters above sea level, at Eidsbugarden in the Jotunheimen area in southern Norway. Approximately 15 rock bands play at this festival on the first weekend in August each year.

The festival was arranged for the first time on 4 and 5 August 2006, with artists as Dumdum Boys, Thomas Dybdahl, Minor Majority and The Blackbirds on stage. In 2007 artists like BigBang, Sivert Høyem, Adjágas and Blood, Sweat & Tears played at the festival.

Vinjerock got its name from the famous Norwegian poet, Aasmund Olavsson Vinje, who built the first cabin at Eidsbugarden, and gave the surrounding mountains their name, Jotunheimen.

There was not a festival in 2011. To allow the grounds to be expanded thus protecting the vulnerable mountain nature of the area, the organizers received funds in 2008 earmarked the establishment of a park on the banks if the river Bygdin. A festival took place between 19 - 21 July 2012. In addition, the 2019 festival took place July 18, 2019 – July 20, 2019 and included ten bands playing a set list of 10-14 songs per band.

References

External links
 Vinjerock

Music festivals in Norway
Rock festivals in Norway
Recurring events established in 2006
2006 establishments in Norway
Jotunheimen